"It takes a village to raise a child" is a proverb that means that an entire community of people must provide for and interact positively with children for those children to experience and grow in a safe and healthy environment.

Attributions 
The proverb has been attributed to African cultures. In 2016, the USA's National Public Radio (NPR) researched the origins of the proverb but was unable to pinpoint them, although academics said the proverb embodies the spirit of several African cultures.

Examples of African societies with proverbs that translate to 'It takes a village ...' include the following:
 In Lunyoro (Bunyoro) there is a proverb that says “Omwana takulila nju emoi,” whose literal translation is “A child does not grow up only in a single home.”
 In Kihaya (Bahaya) there is a saying, “Omwana taba womoi,” which translates as “A child belongs not to one parent or home.”
 Kijita (Wajita) has the proverb, “Omwana ni wa bhone,” meaning regardless of a child's biological parents, its upbringing belongs to the community.
 In Swahili, the proverb “” means roughly the same: "Whomsoever is not taught by the mother will be taught with the world."

In book titles 
 It Takes a Village by Jane Cowen-Fletcher, published in 1994
 It Takes a Village: And Other Lessons Children Teach Us, by Hillary Rodham Clinton, published in 1996

References 

Proverbs